Water Crag may refer to:
A secondary summit of Rogan's Seat, a mountain in North Yorkshire, England
A summit on the Circuit of Devoke Water, Cumbria, England, and one of The Outlying Fells of Lakeland